Aurangzeb Leghari (born 25 October 1944) is a Pakistani TV actor who has been working in TV dramas since the 1970s. His notable TV plays include Waris, Dehleez, Waqat, Uchay Burj Lahore Dey, and Chanan Tey Dariya. He was honored with the Pride of Performance Award in  2014.

Life and career
Leghari was born on 25 October 1944 in Rahimabad, Rahim Yar Khan, British India. He completed his education at the Government Central Model School, Lahore. Later, he went to the Government College Lahore to earn his graduate degree.
 
Leghari started his acting career by participating in theatrical plays in the 1960s. His debut TV play was Samjohta, but he got fame by acting a role in Amjad Islam Amjad's play Waris, telecast in 1979-1980 on PTV.

He also appeared in some Urdu films like Naureen, Faslay (1981), and others.

Filmography

TV
His notable TV plays include:
  Waris (1979)
 Dehleez (1981)
 Andhera Ujala (1984 - 1985)
 Waqat
 Hazaroon Rastay
 Faraib
 Uchay Burj Lahore Dey
 Tali Thalay
 Chanan Tey Dariya

Film
 Naureen
 Faslay

Awards

References

Pakistani male film actors
Pakistani male television actors
1944 births
Recipients of the Pride of Performance
Living people
Government College University, Lahore alumni